Karnataka cuisine includes the cuisines of the different regions and communities of the Indian state of Karnataka, namely, Uttara Karnataka cuisine, Dakshina Karnataka cuisine, Udupi cuisine, Mangalurean cuisine, Kodava cuisine, Saraswat cuisine, Mangalurean Catholic cuisine and Navayath Muslim cuisine.

See also
 Mangalorean Catholic cuisine
 Mavalli Tiffin Room
 Saraswat cuisine
 Udupi cuisine

References

External links 
 

Desi cuisine
 
Vegetarian cuisine
South Indian cuisine
Indian cuisine by state or union territory